5175 Ables, provisional designation , is a bright Hungaria asteroid from the inner regions of the asteroid belt, approximately 5 kilometers in diameter. It was discovered by American astronomers Carolyn and Eugene Shoemaker at the U.S. Palomar Observatory, California, on 4 November 1988. It was named after American astronomer Harold Ables.

Orbit and classification 

Ables is a member of the Hungaria family, which form the innermost dense concentration of asteroids in the Solar System.

It orbits the Sun at a distance of 1.9–2.0 AU once every 2 years and 9 months (1,008 days). Its orbit has an eccentricity of 0.04 and an inclination of 17° with respect to the ecliptic. A first precovery was obtained at Palomar Observatory in 1954, extending the asteroid's observation arc by 34 years prior to its official discovery observation.

Physical characteristics 

Ables has been characterized as a bright E-type asteroid.

Diameter and albedo 

Based on the surveys carried out by the NASA's space-based Wide-field Infrared Survey Explorer and its subsequent NEOWISE mission, Ables has an albedo of 0.29 and 0.51, with a corresponding diameter of 5.7 and 4.3 kilometers, respectively, while the Collaborative Asteroid Lightcurve Link assumes an albedo of 0.30 and calculates a diameter of 5.3 kilometers with an absolute magnitude of 13.3.

Lightcurves 

Between 2010 and 2014, three rotational lightcurves of Ables have been obtained by American astronomer Brian Warner at the Palmer Divide Station in Colorado. The best result gave a short rotation period of  hours with a brightness variation of 0.10 magnitude.

Naming 

This minor planet was named after American astronomer Harold D. Ables (born 1938). While director at the United States Naval Observatory Flagstaff Station (NOFS), he was responsible for the station's transition from photographic plates to CCD imaging. The body's name was suggested by the JPL Ephemeris Group and subsequently proposed by the discoverers. The approved naming citation was published by the Minor Planet Center on 1 July 1996 .

References

External links 
  
 Lightcurve plot of 5175 Ables, Palmer Divide Observatory, B. D. Warner (2010)
 Asteroid Lightcurve Database (LCDB), query form (info )
 Dictionary of Minor Planet Names, Google books
 Asteroids and comets rotation curves, CdR – Observatoire de Genève, Raoul Behrend
 Discovery Circumstances: Numbered Minor Planets (5001)-(10000) – Minor Planet Center
 
 

005175
Discoveries by Carolyn S. Shoemaker
Discoveries by Eugene Merle Shoemaker
Named minor planets
005175
19881104